Toran James (born March 8, 1974) is a former professional American football linebacker who has played for the San Diego Chargers, Seattle Seahawks, and the Las Vegas Outlaws of the defunct XFL. He grew up in Ahoskie, North Carolina

High school
Toran's first high school was General H.H. Arnold High School in Wiesbaden, Germany. During his freshman year (88'-89') he helped lead the junior varsity "Warriors" football team to an undefeated season. He played on the varsity squad the next two years before moving back to the U.S., where he lettered as a defensive end for the Hertford County High Bears in Ahoskie, North Carolina.

College career
James attended North Carolina A&T. In his freshman year he was named conference rookie of the year in 1992. He finished his collegiate career with 175 tackles and 14 sacks. Toran played linebacker as well as defensive end. In 1995, he was granted a medical redshirt due to knee surgery. He majored in history.

Professional career
Toran was drafted by the San Diego Chargers in the 7th round of the 1997 NFL Draft. Toran was a backup linebacker behind Kurt Gouveia and special teams contributor and saw action in 14 games. Toran suffered a knee injury during mid season and missed weeks 9 and 10. He finished the season with 7 tackles. In 1998, he was released by the Chargers during the preseason. In 1999, he was signed by the Seattle Seahawks, again he was released during preseason. In the same year he was signed by the Green Bay Packers but again was released. In 2000, James was drafted by the Las Vegas Outlaws with pick number 85 of the XFL Draft. James made a huge impact by his stellar pre-season game against the Memphis Maniax During the 2001 season he recorded 12 tackles. In 2000, James was a member of the Carolina Cobras. After the XFL folded, James signed with the Detroit Fury of the Arena Football League. He was a member of the team for the 2001 and 2002 seasons. On January 11, 2005, Toran James was signed by the Columbus Destroyers by was later released during camp.

References

External links
 Just Sports Stats
 Las Vegas Outlaws Bio
 NFL Bio
 Arena Football Bio
 SI Bio
 Interview about XFL fold

Las Vegas Outlaws (XFL) players
1974 births
San Diego Chargers players
Seattle Seahawks players
Carolina Cobras players
Detroit Fury players
Columbus Destroyers players
North Carolina A&T Aggies football players
Living people
Green Bay Packers players